The 1970–71 Notre Dame Fighting Irish men's basketball team represented the University of Notre Dame during the 1970–71 season.

Guard Austin Carr was the team's captain and leading scorer, averaging 38.0 points per game. After the season, Carr was selected as a first-team player on the 1971 All-America team. Center Collis Jones was the leading rebounder with an average of 13.2 rebounds per game.

The team's sole loss was by a 79–72 score against Drake in the NCAA Tournament.

Following the season, Austin Carr was drafted by Cleveland Cavaliers with the first pick 1971 NBA Draft.

Roster

Schedule

Team players drafted into the NBA

References 

Notre Dame
Notre Dame Fighting Irish
Notre Dame Fighting Irish
Notre Dame Fighting Irish men's basketball seasons
Notre Dame